Nico Klotz (born 20 September 1986) is a German former professional footballer who played as a defender or midfielder.

Career
Klotz joined MSV Duisburg for the 2014–15 season. On 9 May 2018, it was announced that he will leave Duisburg at the end of the 2017–18 season.

Personal life
In March 2019, Klotz moved to Tus Mündelheim, a Bezirksliga team, while playing for their second team in the Kreisliga.

References

External links

Living people
1986 births
Sportspeople from Heilbronn
German footballers
Association football midfielders
VfB Stuttgart II players
FC Erzgebirge Aue players
SC Paderborn 07 players
SV Sandhausen players
MSV Duisburg players
2. Bundesliga players
3. Liga players
Footballers from Baden-Württemberg